In the 2001 State Farm Women's Doubles Tennis Classic, Lisa Raymond and Rennae Stubbs won the final on a walkover against Kim Clijsters and Meghann Shaughnessy.

Seeds
Champion seeds are indicated in bold text while text in italics indicates the round in which those seeds were eliminated.

 Lisa Raymond /  Rennae Stubbs (champions)
 Cara Black /  Elena Likhovtseva (first round)
 Els Callens /  Katie Schlukebir (first round)
 Sonya Jeyaseelan /  Kimberly Po (first round)

Draw

References
 2001 State Farm Women's Tennis Classic Doubles Draw

2001 Doubles
2001 WTA Tour